Retrospect is a 2001 video album by American rock band Sevendust, featuring behind-the-scenes footage, music videos, and live performances.

Track listing 
Retrospect – History of Sevendust
Retrospect – The first album Sevendust
Retrospect – The second album Home
Retrospect – Woodstock 1999
Retrospect – Lynn Strait / "Angel's Son"
Retrospect – Preview of Animosity
Live and Loud – "Too Close to Hate"
Live and Loud – "Bitch"
"Denial" (music video)
"Waffle" (music video)
"Licking Cream" (music video)
"Angel's Son"
"Angel's Son" – The Tonight Show with Jay Leno
"Waffle" – Late Night with Conan O'Brien
"Angel's Son" – Worcester Centrum (2000)
"Black" – The Palladium (1998)
"Rumblefish" – Woodstock (1999)
Electronic Press Kit (1997)

Personnel 
 Lajon Witherspoon – vocals
 Clint Lowery – lead guitar, backing vocals
 John Connolly – rhythm guitar
 Vinnie Hornsby – bass guitar
 Morgan Rose – drums, backing vocals

Sevendust albums
2001 compilation albums
2001 live albums
2001 video albums
Live video albums
Music video compilation albums
TVT Records video albums